We'll Meet Again: The Very Best of Vera Lynn is a compilation album by English singer Vera Lynn.

The album is a selection of her recordings made for Decca Records, for whom Lynn recorded between 1936 and 1959. It reached number one on the UK Albums Chart on 13 September 2009, making her at age 92 the oldest living artist to achieve this feat with an album. The album entered the chart at number 20 on 30 August, and then climbed to number 2 the following week, before reaching the top position.

Track listing

Performance
Vocals - Vera Lynn;
 with Mantovani & His Orchestra (Track 1)
 with Sailors, Soldiers & Airmen of Her Majesty's Forces (Tracks 2, 3, 7, 20)
 with Roland Shaw & His Orchestra (Tracks 7, 12, 15)
 with Woolf Phillips And His Orchestra (Track 13)
 with Charles Smart (Track 16)
 with The Clubmen (Track 17)
 with Eric Rogers and his Orchestra (Track 19)

Charts

Weekly charts

Year-end charts

Certifications

References

2009 compilation albums
Vera Lynn albums
Decca Records compilation albums